Niels Florin (3 October 1892 – 17 August 1949) was a Danish weightlifter. He competed in the men's featherweight event at the 1920 Summer Olympics.

References

External links
 

1892 births
1949 deaths
Danish male weightlifters
Olympic weightlifters of Denmark
Weightlifters at the 1920 Summer Olympics
People from Helsingør
Sportspeople from the Capital Region of Denmark